The 2009 NCAA Division I FCS football season, the 2009 season of college football for teams in the Football Championship Subdivision (FCS), began in August 2009 and concluded with the 2009 NCAA Division I Football Championship Game on December 18, 2009, in Chattanooga, Tennessee, won by Villanova 23–21 over Montana.

Rule changes for 2009
The NCAA football rules committee proposed several rule changes for 2009.  Before these rules were officially adopted, the proposals had to be approved by the Playing Rules Oversight Panel.  The rule changes include the following:

If the home team wears colored jerseys, the visiting team may also wear colored jerseys; so long as the two teams have agreed to do so.
If the punter carries the ball outside of the tackle box, he is no longer protected under the roughing the kicker penalty.
Deliberately grabbing the chin strap is now included as part of the face mask penalty.
The edge of the tackle box is defined as being 5 yards to the left and right of the snapper, rather than 2 parallel lines from the position of the offensive tackles.

FCS team wins over FBS teams
In the 2009 season, FCS teams played a total of 91 games against FBS opponents. Notably, four of the five victorious FCS teams—all except Central Arkansas—were members of the Colonial Athletic Association. All four made that season's playoffs and advanced to the quarterfinals. Richmond lost in that round to Appalachian State, while Villanova defeated both New Hampshire (quarterfinals) and William & Mary (semifinals) on its way to the national title.

 September 3 – Villanova 27, Temple 24
 September 5 – Richmond 24, Duke 16
 September 5 – William & Mary  26, Virginia 14
 September 12 – New Hampshire  23, Ball State 16
 September 19 –   28, Western Kentucky 7

Notable upsets
August 27 –  26,  20 OT (Division II over Division I FCS)
September 5 –  27,  3 (Division II over Division I FCS)
September 5 –  20,  6 (Division II over Division I FCS)
September 5 –  31,  6 (Division II over Division I FCS non-scholarship)
September 5 –  45, Wagner 42 (Division II over Division I FCS)
September 12 –  35, Campbell 28 OT (Division III over Division I FCS non-scholarship)
September 12 – Lenoir-Rhyne 42,  0 (Division II over Division I FCS non-scholarship)
September 12 –  13,  10 (Division II over Division I FCS non-scholarship)
September 26 –  34,  24 (Division III over Division I FCS non-scholarship)
September 26 –  23, Savannah State 21 (USCAA over Division I FCS)
September 26 –  33,  22 (Division II over Division I FCS)
October 17 – Sioux Falls 28,  13 (NAIA over Division I FCS)
November 14 –  35, Savannah State 20 (NAIA over Division I FCS)
November 26 –  21,  0 (Division II over Division I FCS)

Conference and program changes

Dropped programs
After Northeastern's final game of the season, a 33–27 win over Rhode Island on November 21, the school announced that it was dropping the football program. The Huskies ended their 74th season with a 3–8 record, but school officials cited that losing seasons were not the determining factor.

On December 3, Hofstra also announced that it was dropping their football program in favor of academic funding. The football team, which finished the season 5–6 after a 52–38 win over Massachusetts, ended their program after 73 years.

The Colonial Athletic Association, where both teams played, decided to replace the two teams with new programs at Old Dominion and Georgia State in 2011 and 2012, respectively.  Old Dominion started its program during the 2009 season;  Georgia State started theirs in 2010.

Conference changes

Eastern Illinois coach's death 
On Saturday, November 28, just hours after Eastern Illinois lost to Southern Illinois 48–7 in the first round of the FCS playoffs, Eastern Illinois' offensive coordinator Jeffrey O. Hoover, age 41, was killed in a car accident. The single-vehicle accident occurred south of Effingham when Hoover, his family and EIU strength coach Eric Cash struck a deer while driving home from Carbondale, the home of SIU.

Hoover's death was the second Eastern Illinois coaching death within a month. On November 4, women's basketball assistant coach Jackie Moore, 28, died after collapsing during a workout on campus.

Conference standings

Conference champions

Automatic berths
Big Sky Conference – Montana
Colonial Athletic Association – Villanova
Missouri Valley Football Conference – Southern Illinois
Mid-Eastern Athletic Conference – South Carolina State
Ohio Valley Conference – Eastern Illinois (Jacksonville State had the best record in conference play, but was not eligible for the FCS playoffs because of APR violations.)
Patriot League – Holy Cross
Southern Conference – Appalachian State
Southland Conference – Stephen F. Austin

Invitation
Great West Conference – UC Davis
Big South Conference – Liberty and Stony Brook, co-champions
Northeast Conference – Central Connecticut State
Pioneer Football League – Butler and Dayton, co-champions; Butler received the conference's berth in the Gridiron Classic.

In order to be eligible for the playoffs, these teams must have a minimum of eight Division I wins, with at least two against teams in automatic bid conferences. They also must be ranked an average of 16 or better in the national rankings, made up of the following components:
 The Sports Network media poll
 The FCS Coaches poll
 A variation of the Gridiron Power Index, using only five of the computer rankings used in that system

No team in the invitational conferences qualified. Starting in 2010, the Big South and NEC will become automatic bid conferences with the expansion of the playoff field to 20 teams.

Abstains
Ivy League – Penn (8–2, 7–0)
Southwestern Athletic Conference – Prairie View A&M (9–1, 7–0)

 (Overall Record, Conference Record)

Postseason

NCAA Division I playoff bracket

* Host institution

SWAC Championship Game

Gridiron Classic
The Gridiron Classic is an annual game between the champions of the Northeast Conference and the Pioneer Football League that has been held since December 2006.

Final poll standings

Standings are from The Sports Network final poll.

Standings are from the FCS Coaches final poll.

References